Maserà di Padova is a comune (municipality) in the Province of Padua in the Italian region of Veneto, located about  southwest of Venice and about  south of Padua.

Maserà di Padova borders the following municipalities: Abano Terme, Albignasego, Cartura, Casalserugo, Due Carrare.

Demographic evolution

Twin towns
 Tura, Hungary (2004)

References

External links
View at Wikimapia

Cities and towns in Veneto